Hardwicke is a surname. Notable people with the surname include:

 Catherine Hardwicke (born 1955), American film director
 Cedric Hardwicke (1893–1964), English actor 
 Edward Hardwicke (1932–2011), English actor, son of Cedric
 John W. Hardwicke (1927–2009), American politician and judge
 Mary Nickerson Hardwicke, historian of the Crusades
 Robert Hardwicke (1822–1875), British publisher
 Thomas Hardwicke (1756–1835), British soldier and naturalist

Fictional characters:
 Gillian Hardwicke, a fictional ADA appearing in Law & Order: Special Victims Unit

See also
 Hardwick (surname)
 Hardwicke (disambiguation)

English-language surnames